Here are the nominees and winners of the Black Reel Award for Best Supporting Actor in a Television Movie/Cable. The category was reinstated in 2013 after a five-year hiatus.

Multiple Nominees
 Mekhi Phifer - 3 nominations 
 Harry Lennix, Danny Glover, Bokeem Woodbine - 2 nominations

Winners/Nominees

References

Black Reel Awards
Television awards for Best Supporting Actor